Custom Kings is a Melbourne, Victoria, Australia, folk-pop band started in 2002 as solo project for Nick Vorrath .  After three critically acclaimed EPs they released their debut album, At Sea in 2007 and it was followed up with a second, Great Escape, in 2010. The band has toured Australia and they have been on national rotation on Triple J.

Discography

Albums

Extended Plays

References

Victoria (Australia) musical groups